Dark Hollow Run is a tributary of the Ohio River in Hamilton County, Ohio.

References

Rivers of Hamilton County, Ohio
Rivers of Ohio
Tributaries of the Ohio River